Prokineticin receptor 1, also known as PKR1, is a human protein encoded by the PROKR1 gene.

See also
 Prokineticin receptor

References

Further reading

External links

G protein-coupled receptors